Sophienfließ is a river in the hill country „Märkische Schweiz“ and the Märkische Schweiz Nature Park, District Märkisch-Oderland, Brandenburg, Germany.

The water passes across the Schermützelsee and the Werderfließ to the Buckowsee, who is flown through by the river Stöbber.

See also
List of rivers of Brandenburg

Rivers of Brandenburg
Rivers of Germany